The following is a list of French-language films, films mostly spoken in the French language.

1900s

1910s

1920s

1930s

1940s

1950s

1960s

1970s

1980s

1990s

2000s

2010s

2020s

See also
List of French films
List of Quebec films

 
French
Language